{{Infobox Fraternity 
| letters =  
| name = Alpha Tau Delta 
| crest = File:The_crest_of_Alpha_Tau_Delta.jpg
| image_size = 240px
| founded =  
| birthplace = University of California, Berkeley, California 
| affiliation = PFA (former) 
| type = Professional 
| emphasis = Nursing
| scope = National 
| colors =  Yellow,  White,  Blue and  Gold 
| motto = United in Service
| symbol = Caduceus, Lamp, Star
| flower = Yellow Rose
| jewel = Pearl
| chapters = 10 collegiate, 3 alumni 
| lifetime = 10,000 
| publication= T.P.R. of ATD   Cap’tions      The Pulse (as of 2000)
| address = 1904 Poinsettia Avenue 
| city = Manhattan Beach 
| state = CA
| ZIP code = 90266
| country = United States 
| homepage =  
| footnotes= 
|
}}Alpha Tau Delta is a professional fraternity for students and industry professionals in the nursing fields. It was founded in 1921 at University of California, Berkeley as Alpha Tau.

 History 
Alpha Tau Sorority
Nursing students at the University of California at Berkeley after holding conferences with the Dean, the faculty of the University, and the Director of the School of Nursing founded a Nurses’ Sorority on February 15, 1921, on the Berkeley campus. They decided to name the organization Alpha Tau, and the first chapter was named Alpha–the Lady of the Lamp, after Florence Nightingale.

Alpha Tau Delta Fraternity
Soon after, the organizing committee decided that the sorority should be designated as a fraternity since it was professional. The name was changed to Alpha Tau Delta in 1924. The Greek letter Delta was added when it was learned that a male fraternity had a prior claim to the name Alpha Tau. Alpha Tau Delta and its insignia were registered with the United States Patent Office. Alpha Tau Delta became the first nursing fraternity in the United States.

Invitations were then sent to eligible collegiate Schools of Nursing throughout the states to join Alpha Tau Delta. The second chapter to be chartered was Beta, at the University of Minnesota in 1927, followed by Gamma chapter at the University of California of Los Angeles in 1928. Since new chapters were being founded on different campuses in different cities, a central office was established at Berkeley.

Its first national publication, the T.P.R. of ATD, was published in 1931. Later, the name was changed to Cap’tions of ALPHA TAU DELTA and was changed to The Pulse in 2000.

ATD’s first national convention was held in 1932, in conjunction with the American Nurses Association Biennial Convention with six chapters participating. The fraternity has met in national conventions each biennium from 1931 to the present time, except during World War II in 1944 or under exceptional circumstances.

In the early 1970s, Alpha Tau Delta opened membership to male nursing students, and the Articles of Incorporation of Alpha Tau Delta were changed to reflect this decision. The fraternity became a charter member of the Professional Fraternity Association in 1978. This association was the consolidation of the Professional Panhellenic Association founded in 1925 and the Professional Interfraternity Conference founded in 1928.

In 1992, Alpha Tau Delta replaced pledging with a membership orientation period.

 Symbols 
Alpha Tau Delta's colors are yellow, white, blue, and gold. Its flower is the yellow rose and its jewel is the pearl. The fraternity's motto is "United in Service".

 Chapters 
Chapters of Alpha Tau Delta include the following. Alumni chapters end in Pi. Those in bold''' are active, those italicized'' are inactive:

See also 

 Professional fraternities and sororities

References 

Student organizations established in 1921
Professional medical fraternities and sororities in the United States
1921 establishments in California
Former members of Professional Fraternity Association